Philippe Tourret (born 8 July 1967 in Tonneins) is a retired French athlete who specialised in the sprint hurdles. He represented his country at the 1988 and 1992 Summer Olympics. In addition he won the bronze medal at the 1989 European Indoor Championships.

His personal bests are 13.28 seconds in the 110 metres hurdles (-1.0 m/s, Monaco 1990) and 7.56 seconds in the 60 metres hurdles (Paris 1991).

Competition record

References

All-Athletics profile

1967 births
Living people
Sportspeople from Lot-et-Garonne
French male hurdlers
Olympic athletes of France
Athletes (track and field) at the 1988 Summer Olympics
Athletes (track and field) at the 1992 Summer Olympics
20th-century French people
21st-century French people